Ajatasattu (Pāli ) or Ajatashatru (Sanskrit ) in Buddhist tradition, or Kunika and Kuniya in the Jain histories, (c. 492 to 460 BCE or early 5th century BCE) was one of the most important kings of the Haryanka dynasty of Magadha in East India. He was the son of King Bimbisara and was a contemporary of both Mahavira and Gautama Buddha. He forcefully took over the kingdom of Magadha from his father and imprisoned him. He fought a war against the Vajjika League, led by the Licchavis, and conquered the republic of Vaishali. The city of Pataliputra was formed by fortification of a village by Ajatashatru.

Ajatashatru followed policies of conquest and expansion. He defeated his neighbours including the king of Kosala; his brothers, at odds with him, went to Kashi, which had been given to Bimbisara as dowry and led to a war between Magadha and Kosala.

Ajatashatru occupied Kashi and captured the smaller kingdoms. Magadha under Ajatashatru became the most powerful kingdom in North India.

He is the presumed inventor of two weapons used in war: the rathamusala (scythed chariot) and the mahashilakantaka (engine to eject big stones).

Datings
Based on correlation with dates in the Mahavamsa and concluding that the Buddha died in 483 BC, A. L. Basham dated the accession of Ajatashatru to 491 BC. He estimates the first campaign of Ajatashatru to have taken place in 485 BC, and his second campaign against the Vajjis in 481–480 BC. The Samannaphala Sutta states that Ajatashatru visited the six teachers to hear their doctrines and at last visited the Buddha, an event Basham estimated to have taken place in 491 BC.

Birth

Ajatashatru, also known as Kunika, was the son of Bimbisara. The ancient inscription in Government Museum, Mathura refers to him as vaidehi putra Ajatashatru Kunika "Ajatashatru Kunika, the son of Vaidehi." The story of Ajatashatru is found in the Tripiṭaka of Buddhism and Jain Agamas. The account of Ajatashatru's birth is more or less similar in both the traditions. According to Jainism, Ajatashatru was born to King Bimbisara and Queen Chellana; Buddhist tradition records Ajatashatru being born to Bimbisara and Kosala Devi. It is worthwhile to note that both the queens were called "Vaidehi" in both traditions.

According to the Jain Nirayavalika Sutra, during her pregnancy, Queen Chellana had a strong desire to eat the fried flesh of her husband's heart and drink liquor. Meanwhile, the very intelligent Prince Abhayakumara, son of King Bimbisara and Queen Nanda, fried a wild fruit that resembled a heart and gave it to the queen. The queen ate it and later felt ashamed for having such a demonic desire and she feared that the child might grow up and prove fatal for the family, thus after a few months of the child being born, the queen had him thrown out of the palace. When the child was lying near the garbage dump, a cock bit his little finger. King Bimbisara, learning about the child being thrown out, ran outside and picked up the child and put its bleeding little finger in his mouth and sucked it until it stopped bleeding and continued this for days until it was healed. As the little finger of the child was sore, he was nicknamed Kunika "Sore Finger". Later he was named Asokacanda.

In the Buddhist Atthakatha, the above story is almost the same, except that Kosaladevi desired to drink blood from Bimbisara's arm; the king obliged her and, later, when the child was thrown near the garbage dump, due to an infection he got a boil on his little finger and the king sucked it and once while sucking it the boil burst inside the king's mouth, but due to affection for his child he did not spit the pus out, rather swallowed it.

War and victory over Vaishali

The feud between Ajatashatru and Licchavi during 484–468 BCE led to defeat of the latter.

The Jaina Tradition
Once Queen Padmavati, wife of Ajatashatru, was sitting in her balcony in the evening. She saw Halla and Vihalla kumaras with their wives sitting on Sechanaka elephant and one of the wives wearing the 18 fold divine necklace. Then she heard one of the maidservants making from the garden below "It's Halla and Vihalla kumaras and not the king who enjoy the real pleasures of the kingdom" and she thought "what's the use of the kingdom if I do not have both the jewels in my possession?"

So, she shared this thought with Ajatashatru the same night and became excessively insistent in her demand. Ajatashatru, at last, agreed and sent a request to both his brothers to give the elephant and the necklace to him, which both his brothers denied saying that these gifts were given by their dear father so why should they part from them? Ajatashatru sent the request thrice but got the same reply all three times. This greatly annoyed him, so he sent his men to arrest them. Meanwhile, Halla and the Vihalla kumaras availed a chance and escaped to their maternal grandfather Chetaka who was the king of the great kingdom of the Vaishali republic (Vajjis/Licchavis). Ajatashatru sent notice thrice to Chetaka to surrender them but was denied by Chetaka.

This was enough for Ajatashatru. He called his half brothers, Kalakumaras (10 kalakumaras, those born to King Bimbisara and 10 Kali Queens Kali, Sukali, Mahakali, etc.) to merge their army with his, since it was well known to Ajatashatru that Vaishali republic had always been invincible in the past and he alone would not be able to defeat it. Each Kalakumara brought 3000 horses, 3000 elephants, 3000 chariots and 30000 infantrymen each. On the other hand, Chetaka invited his own allies 9 Mallas, 9 Lichhvis and 18 kings of Kasi-Kosala to fight his grandson Ajatashatru. All these kings came with 3000 horses, 3000 elephants, 3000 chariots and 30000 infantrymen each. Thus all together there were 57000 elephants, 57000 chariots, 57000 horses, and 570000 infantrymen.

The war began. King Chetaka was a devout follower of Mahavira and had a vow to not shoot more than one arrow per day in a war. It was known to all that Chetaka's aim was perfect and his arrows were infallible. His first arrow killed one Kalakumara, commander of Ajatashatru. On the consecutive nine days the rest of the nine Kalakumaras were killed by Chetaka. Deeply sorrowed by the death of their sons, the Kali queens were initiated as nuns in the holy order of Mahavira.

As Ajatashatru was moving towards defeat he practised penance for three days and offered prayers to Sakrendra and Charmendra (Indra of different heavens) who then helped him in the war. They protected him from the infallible arrow of Chetaka. The war became very severe and by the divine influence of the Indras even the pebbles, straws, leaves hurled by Ajatashatru's men were said to have fell like rocks on the army of Chetaka. This weapon was thus named Mahasilakantaka, i.e. the weapon through which more than a lakh (1,00,000) people died. 
Next, the Indras granted a huge, automatically moving chariot with swinging spiked maces on each side, and said to have been driven by Charmendra himself, to Ajatashatru. The chariot moved about in the battlefield crushing lakhs of soldiers. This war-chariot was named Ratha-Musala.

In this battle, Chetaka was defeated. But, Chetaka and others immediately took shelter inside the city walls of Vaishali and closed the main gate. The walls around Vaishali were so strong that Ajatashatru was unable to break through them. Many days passed, Ajatashatru became furious and again prayed to Indra, but this time Indra refused to help him. But Ajatashatru was informed by an oracle of a demi-goddess "Vaishali can be conquered if Sramana (monk) Kulvalaka gets married to a courtesan."

Ajatashatru inquired about the monk Kulvalaka and sent for the prostitute Magadhika disguised as a devout follower. The fallen woman attracted the monk towards herself and finally, the monk gave up his monkhood and married her. Later Magadhika on Ajatashatru's orders brainwashed Kulvalaka to enter Vaishali disguised as an astrologer. With great difficulty, he did enter Vaishali and learned that the city was saved by a Chaitya (altar) dedicated to Munisuvrata. Kulvalaka then started telling people that this altar is the reason why the city is suffering through a bad period. The people uprooted the altar from its very foundation. Kulvalaka gave a signal and Ajatashatru proceeded as per prior arrangement. This was the last attack. Vaishali was conquered by Ajatashatru.

Sechanaka the elephant died after it fell in a pit with iron rods and fire made by Ajatashatru's soldiers. Later Halla and Vihalla kumaras got initiated as monks in the holy order of Mahavira. Chetaka courted Sallekahna (fasted unto death). Ajatashatru not only conquered Vaishali but also Kasi-Kosala.

The Buddhist traditions
There was a diamond mine near a village on the river Ganges. There was an agreement between Ajatashatru and the Licchavi of Vajji that they would have an equal share of the diamonds. However, because of sheer lethargy, Ajatashatru failed to collect his own share, and most of diamonds were carried away by the Lichhavis. Over time, finally, Ajatashatru became annoyed and decided to do something about it. Since he thought that it might be almost impossible to fight against the whole confederacy of Vaishali, he decided instead to uproot the powerful Vajjis and exterminate them. He sent his chief minister Vassakara to the Buddha to ask him why the Vaishali should be so invincible; to which Buddha gave seven reasons, including: That the Vajjis are always punctual to meetings, their disciplined behavior, their respect for elders, respect for women, that they do not marry their daughters forcefully, that they give spiritual protection to the Arhats, and finally, the main reason was the Chaityas (altar), which was inside the town.

Thus, with the help of his chief minister Vassakara, Ajatashatru managed to split the Vajjis and also broke the chaityas inside. During this battle, Ajatashatru used a scythed chariot, featuring a swinging mace and blades on both sides and attacked the town with it and conquered it.

Kingdom

Ajatashatru moved his capital from Rajgriha to Champa due to death of his father.

Family

The Jaina tradition
According to the Nirayāvaliyā Suttā Ajatashatru was born to King Bimbisara and Queen kosala Devi, who was the daughter of Chetaka the king of Vaishali, who was the brother of Queen Triśalá, mother of Mahavira. Ajatashatru had eight wives.

The Buddhist tradition

According to Dīgha nikāya, Ajatashatru was born to King Bimbisara and Queen Kosala Devi, who was the daughter of Maha-Kosala, the king of Kosala and sister of Pasenadi who later succeeded to the throne. Ajatashatru had 500 wives but the principal consort was Princess Vajira. The City of Kasi was given to Bimbisara as dowry by Maha-Kosala. After the murder of Bimbisara, Prasenajit took the city back. This resulted in a war between Ajatashatru and Prasenajit. The war ended in a peace treaty in which Prasenajit married his daughter Vajira to him. Ajatashatru later had a son named Udayabhadda or Udayabhadra.

Death
The account of his death differs widely between Jain and Buddhist traditions. Other accounts point towards  as the year of his death.

The Jaina tradition
According to the Jaina text, Āvaśȳaka Chūrnī, Ajatashatru went to meet Mahavira. 
Ajatashatru asked, "Bhagvant! Where do Chakravartins (world-monarchs) go after their death?"
Mahavira replied that "A Chakravartin, if dying while in the office goes to the seventh hell called Mahā-Tamahprabhā, and if dying as a monk attains Nirvana."
Ajatashatru asked, "So will I Attain Nirvana or go to the seventh hell?"
Mahavira replied, "Neither of them, you will go to the Sixth hell." 
Ajatashatru asked, "Bhagvant, then am I not a Chakravartin?",
to which Mahavira replied, "No, you are not."

This made Ajatashatru anxious to become a world-monarch. He created 12 artificial jewels and set out for the conquest of the six regions of the world. But when he reached the Timisra Caves he was stopped by a guardian Deva called Krutamāl who said, "Only a Chakravartin can pass through this cave, there can be not more than 12 Chakravartin in the half cycle of a Kalchakra, and already there have been 12." On this, Ajatashatru said arrogantly, "Then count me as the thirteenth and let me go or else my mace is strong enough to reach you to Yama." The Deva became enraged at Ajatashatru's arrogance and by his power, he reduced him to ashes right on the spot. Ajatashatru was then reborn in the sixth hell called Tamahprabhā.

The Buddhist tradition
Ajatashatru was brutally murdered by his own son, Udayabhadra, who was greedy of his kingdom. Ajatashatru was reborn in the hell called "Lohakumbhiya", and would suffer there for sixty thousand years.

Although the account of Ajatashatru's death differs in these traditions, both believe that after passing through many rebirths, Ajatashatru will be born as a wise prince, and later become a monk and attain Nirvana.

Religion

Ajatashatru is mentioned in both Jaina and Buddhist traditions.

The Uvavai/Aupapātika sutta, which is the first Upānga (see Jain Agamas) of the Jains throws light on the relation between Mahavira and Ajatashatru. It accounts that Ajatashatru held Mahavira in the highest esteem. The same text also states that Ajatashatru had an officer to report to him about the daily routine of Mahavira. He was paid lavishly. The officer had a vast network and supporting field staff through whom he collected all the information about Mahavira and reported to the king. The Uvavai Sutta has detailed and illuminating discussion on Mahavira's arrival at the city of Champa, the honor was shown to him by Ajatashatru, the sermon given by Mahavira in Ardhamagadhi language, etc.

According to Buddhist tradition, the Samaññaphala Sutta deals with his first meeting with the Buddha, where he realized his mistakes with his association to Devadatta and plan to killing his own father. According to the same text, during this meeting, Ajatashatru took protection of the Buddha, the Dhamma and the Sangha. He was mentioned more than once in several other Sutta as an example of strong devotee to the Buddha, the Dhamma, and the Sangha. He erected a vast Stupa on the bones and ashes of the Buddha after the funeral, and Ajatashatru also was present in the first Buddhist council at the Sattapanni (Saptparni) caves Rajgriha.

In Mahayana Buddhism, Ajatashatru plays a significant soteriological role. He appears in the Mahayana Mahaparinirvana Sutra as a being completely overtaken by evil and suffering, and as such the prototype of an ordinary, sinful person who can only be saved by the Buddha's compassion; the Buddha even declares in this sutra that he will "remain in the world for the sake of Ajatashatru". This episode, along with the broader theme of the Age of Dharma Decline, informed several Mahayana schools' emphasis on faith rather than accumulating merit.

Whether Ajatashatru was a Jain or Buddhist, both texts accounted for him as a devotee of the respective religions.

Depictions in popular culture
 A fictionalised account of Ajatashatru – depicted as a physically gross and tyrannical figure , who delights in committing atrocities and massacres – appears in Gore Vidal's novel Creation.
 A film about his life was released titled Ajatashatru. He also features as the protagonist in the film Amrapali (1966), starring Sunil Dutt and Vyjayanthimala in titular role.
 A book about his life was written titled Ajatashatru, by Subba Rao.

See also
 Jain Agamas (Śvētāmbara)
 Samaññaphala Sutta
 Maharaja Ajasath, a biographical Sinhala-language film directed by Sanath Abesekara. Gayan Wickramathilaka played the character 
 Avanti-Magadhan Wars

References

Citations

Sources

Further reading
 Ācharya Nagrajji D.Litt. "Agama and Tripitaka- A comparative study of Lord Mahavira and Lord Buddha", vol. 1, History and Tradition, chapter 14 "Follower Kings" pg.355-377. (English version by Muni Mahendrakumarji) published by Concept Publishing Company, New Delhi 110059.
 G.P.Singh,2004. "Early Indian Historical Tradition and Archaeology". D.K.Printworld(P)Ltd-New Delhi 110015; pp. 164, 165
 Jain Aagam 1st Upanga Uvavai Sutta Chapter Kunika
 Basham, A. L. (1951) “Ajātasattu’s War with the Licchavis,” Proceedings of the Indian History Congress 14: 37–41. Available at: http://www.jstor.org/stable/44303932.

External links

 Entry on Ajatasattu in the Buddhist Dictionary of Pali Proper Names

Indian Buddhists
5th-century BC Indian Buddhists
5th-century BC Indian monarchs
Buddhist monarchs
Patricides
History of Bihar
Year of birth unknown
Haryanka dynasty
460s BC deaths
Indian Buddhist monarchs
Kings of Magadha